National Sports University is a central university, located in Imphal, Manipur, India with specialization in sports. 

Prime Minister Narendra Modi has laid foundation stone for National Sports University on 16 March 2018. Courses offered are 
Bachelor of Physical Education & Sports, B.Sc., M.Sc. and M.A.

References

External links
 

Sport in Manipur
Sport schools in India
Universities in Manipur
Physical Education and Sports universities in India
Central universities in India
Education in Imphal
Educational institutions established in 2018
2018 establishments in Manipur
State universities in India